Howard Bradley "Gasser" Gassoff (born November 13, 1955 in Quesnel, British Columbia), is a Canadian former professional ice hockey player. A left wing, Gasoff played for the Vancouver Canucks of the National Hockey League (NHL).

He was drafted by the Canucks in the second round, 28th overall in the 1975 NHL Amateur Draft, and was selected by the Winnipeg Jets in the first round, eighth overall 1975 1975 WHA Amateur Draft. Gassoff spent most of his career in the Central Hockey League (CHL) with the Tulsa Oilers and the Dallas Black Hawks. He later retired as a Dallas player.

Family
His brother Bob also played in the NHL for the St. Louis Blues until his death on May 27, 1977 in a motorcycle accident. His brother Ken, born October 9, 1954, was drafted by the New York Rangers in the 1974 NHL amateur draft and by the Houston Aeros in the 1974 WHA Amateur Draft.

Awards
Ken McKenzie Trophy - 1975–76

Career statistics

Regular season and playoffs

References

External links
 

1955 births
Canadian ice hockey defencemen
Cariboo people
Dallas Black Hawks players
Ice hockey people from British Columbia
Kamloops Chiefs players
Living people
Medicine Hat Tigers players
People from the Cariboo Regional District
Tulsa Oilers (1964–1984) players
Vancouver Canucks draft picks
Vancouver Canucks players
Winnipeg Jets (WHA) draft picks
World Hockey Association first round draft picks
Canadian expatriate ice hockey players in the United States